Mirko Ivanovski (born 31 October 1989) is a Macedonian professional footballer who plays as a striker for Liga I club Petrolul Ploiești.

Club career
Ivanovski began his career with the youth side of Pelister Bitola who was in summer 2006 promoted to the first team, but he left his club in July 2008 to sign for Makedonija Skopje. On 5 February 2010 Slavia Prague has signed the Macedonian U21 national team member, the 20-year-old is considered one of the greatest talents in country. Ivanovski signed a 2-year deal with Polish club Arka Gdynia on 2 August 2010.

Astra Giurgiu
In the summer of 2012, Ivanovski moved to the Romanian club Astra Giurgiu.

Videoton
On 16 January 2015, Ivanovski was signed by Hungarian League club Videoton.

Slaven Belupo
On 4 July 2016, Ivanovski joined the Croatian team Slaven Belupo.

He showed an impressive display, notably in the 2017-18 season, where he was the league's 3rd top scorer along with Mario Gavranović, netting 15 goals in 30 matches.

Hajduk Split
After his contract at Slaven expired, he decided not to extend it and eventually joined Hajduk Split on a free transfer. After scoring 5 goals in 25 games across all competitions, Ivanovski was released by Hajduk on 23 June 2016.

Dinamo București
In September 2021, he signed a contract with Liga I side Dinamo București.

Petrolul Ploiești
On 20 June 2022, following the relegation of Dinamo București to the Liga II, Ivanovski continued in Romania and its first division by signing a two-year deal with Petrolul Ploiești.

International career
He made his senior debut for Macedonia in a December 2010 friendly match away against China and has earned a total of 27 caps, scoring 1 goal. His final international was an October 2015 European Championship qualification match against Ukraine.

Career statistics

International goals

References

External links
Profile at Macedonian Football

1989 births
Living people
Sportspeople from Bitola
Association football forwards
Macedonian footballers
Macedonian First Football League players
Czech First League players
Ekstraklasa players
I liga players
Liga I players
Nemzeti Bajnokság I players
TFF First League players
Croatian Football League players
FK Pelister players
FK Makedonija Gjorče Petrov players
SK Slavia Prague players
Arka Gdynia players
FC Astra Giurgiu players
CFR Cluj players
Fehérvár FC players
Boluspor footballers
NK Slaven Belupo players
HNK Hajduk Split players
Diósgyőri VTK players
FC Dinamo București players
FC Petrolul Ploiești players
North Macedonia youth international footballers
North Macedonia under-21 international footballers
North Macedonia international footballers
Macedonian expatriate footballers
Expatriate footballers in the Czech Republic
Expatriate footballers in Poland
Expatriate footballers in Romania
Expatriate footballers in Hungary
Expatriate footballers in Turkey
Expatriate footballers in Croatia
Macedonian expatriate sportspeople in the Czech Republic
Macedonian expatriate sportspeople in Poland
Macedonian expatriate sportspeople in Romania
Macedonian expatriate sportspeople in Hungary
Macedonian expatriate sportspeople in Turkey
Macedonian expatriate sportspeople in Croatia
[[Category:Macedonian people of Bulgarian descent]